Jasmin Forsyth (née Geisel) (pronounced 'Guy-zle') is an Australian television presenter, journalist, writer, producer & Media/PR consultant.

Forsyth's first role on TV was as the host of a national AFL show, Totally Footy on Network Ten.  She then moved into news as a journalist, before becoming a presenter, writer and field producer on Ten's, Totally Wild.

In 2006, Forsyth joined the Nine Network as a journalist for Queensland programs, Extra and Weekend Extra.
She also filed stories for Nine News and Sport, and hosted the 2008 & 2009 Qld Surf Life Saving Championships.

In 2007, she married freelance senior TV Cameraman/DOP, Lighting Operator and Field Producer, Chris Forsyth.
Currently, she and her husband, run Media Force Productions (https://mediaforce.com.au); a Brisbane-based, one-stop-shop production house for TV Productions, Corporate Videos, PR Videos, Real Estate promotions and high-end wedding DVDs. Forsyth also consults as the Media Manager for Swim Australia.

Before fronting the camera, Forsyth was a swimmer - representing Australia on several occasions. At the 1999/2000 FINA World Cup meets in Shanghai and Hobart, she won silver in the 50m butterfly, and a bronze medal in the 100m freestyle.

After finishing school in Brisbane at Somerville House Girls School, Forsyth gained a Bachelor of Journalism degree from QUT.

References

Year of birth missing (living people)
Living people
Australian people of German descent
Australian television presenters
Australian female butterfly swimmers
Australian female freestyle swimmers
Queensland University of Technology alumni
Australian women television presenters
Australian women journalists